I'll Be Your Girl is the eighth studio album by the American indie rock band The Decemberists, released on March 16, 2018 on Capitol and Rough Trade. Produced by John Congleton, the band experimented with new instrumentation during the album's recording sessions, including several synth-based compositions inspired by New Order and Depeche Mode. The album was preceded by the singles, "Severed" and "Once in My Life".

Writing and composition
The album's lyrical content was, in part, influenced by the 2016 presidential election and its immediate aftermath. Vocalist and guitarist Colin Meloy noted: "[I'll Be Your Girl] celebrates the absurdity of our current predicaments. I think it really is a reflection of my outlook immediately post the 2016 election, where there was immediately this onset of despair. Like real despair. Real depression, and then sort of climbing out of it. Seeing other people feeling the same way, similarly climbing out of their hole and just witnessing events as they came along, rather than with tears. There was almost like an ironic humour but with anger, and those sort of go together. It was about finding the balance between real rage and humour – discovering the wild absurdity in it, but not being blithe."

Track listing

Personnel

The Decemberists
 Colin Meloy - vocals, composer, lyricist, acoustic guitar, background vocals, electric guitar
 Chris Funk - acoustic guitar, background vocals, banjo, bouzouki, electric guitar, mandolin, synthesizer
 Jenny Conlee - accordion, background vocals, organ, piano, synthesizer, vibraphone
 Nate Query - background vocals, cello, electric bass, upright bass
 John Moen - background vocals, drums, percussion

Additional musicians
 Kelly Hogan - background vocals
 Nora O'Connor - background vocals
 Birch Query - choir vocals
 Eleanor Laurie - choir vocals
 Finn Query - choir vocals
 Louise Moen - choir vocals
 Max Markewitz - choir vocals
 Mina Greenberg Motamedi - choir vocals
 Sabrina Montgomery - choir vocals
 Satchel Laurie - choir vocals
 Scout Funk - choir vocals
 Mikaela Davis - harp
 Gaelynn Lea - violin

Technical
 The Decemberists - production
 John Congleton - production, mixing, recording engineering, studio personnel
 Adam Lee - assistant mixing, assistant recording engineering, studio personnel
 Greg Calbi - studio personnel

Charts

References

2018 albums
The Decemberists albums
Albums produced by John Congleton